The Wrestling competition at the 2013 Mediterranean Games was held in the CNR Yenişehir Fair Ground Hall C in Mersin from June 22 to June 26, 2013.

Medal table

Medalists

Men's freestyle

Men's Greco-Roman

Women's freestyle

See also
2013 in wrestling

References 

Wrestling
2013
Mediterranean
International wrestling competitions hosted by Turkey